Schefflera heterophylla is a lower story rainforest tree native to the Malay Peninsula and Sumatra, and belonging to the fFamily Araliaceae.Its common name is great-leaved ivy-palm.  It is noteworthy for having very large leaves which are quadripalmate, (i.e. the leaflet is the fourth order of branching in the leaf), possibly the only hardwood (dicot) tree that is so.

References

heterophylla
Flora of Sumatra
Flora of Malaysia